Yohan M'Vila (born 8 October 1988) is a French footballer who plays for French side Union Sportive Liffré Football as a midfielder.

Club career 
M'vila left in summer 2010 the French club Dijon in Ligue 2 and became a free agent. After six months without any club, he trained with his former club Amiens SC, until Spring 2011 when he signed for Belgian club ROC Charleroi-Marchienne. In 2014, he signed to a Breton club, US Liffré.

International career 
He has been called up to the DR Congo national squad, but has yet to make his debut.

Personal life 
His younger brother is Yann M'Vila, who is a former France international.

Notes

1988 births
Living people
French footballers
Sportspeople from Amiens
Footballers from Hauts-de-France
French expatriate footballers
French sportspeople of Democratic Republic of the Congo descent
Ligue 2 players
AC Ajaccio players
French expatriate sportspeople in Belgium
Dijon FCO players
Expatriate footballers in Belgium
R. Olympic Charleroi Châtelet Farciennes players
FC Mantois 78 players
Association football midfielders
Black French sportspeople